A restaurant is a place for people to eat.

Restaurant may also refer to:

 The Restaurant (British TV series), a BBC Two TV show featuring Raymond Blanc
 The Restaurant (Irish TV series), an RTÉ television series featuring celebrity head chefs each week
 The Restaurant, American reality show series featuring Rocco DiSpirito
 Restaurant (magazine), a British magazine
 Restaurant (1965 film), a film directed by Andy Warhol at The Factory in New York City
 Restaurant (1998 film), a romantic film starring Adrien Brody and Elise Neal, directed by Eric Bross
 Restaurant (2006 film), a Marathi language movie directed by Sachin Kundalkar

See also
 Restaurateur, a term for a person who opens and runs a restaurant